Newham Generals are a grime duo from East London, currently consisting of MCs D Double E and Footsie.

They are best known for their singles "Frontline", "Hard" and "Like It Or Not" as well as their live performances. The group was founded in 2004, after D Double E had a disagreement with fellow members of his previous group N.A.S.T.Y Crew. Newham Generals built up a name for themselves through regular appearances on pirate radio stations and released a number of their singles on white label vinyl. Dizzee Rascal idolised D Double E as an MC in his youth and the group was signed to his record label Dirtee Stank in 2005 after D Double E showed Dirtee Stank a CD of the groups work, and promptly released a mix CD on the label in 2006 entitled The Best of Newham Generals Vol. 1. Founding member Monkstar left the group in 2007. The group released their debut album Generally Speaking on Dirtee Stank in April 2009 which was their last release to feature Monkstar. They followed Generally Speaking with the release of the Bag of Grease EP the following year, as well as various solo projects.

The group's name is taken from Newham General Hospital, now known as Newham University Hospital.

Discography

EPs
2010: Bag of Grease
2013: 5 Star General
2015: N to the G's"

Albums
2006: The Best of Newham Generals2009: Generally SpeakingSide projects
DJ Tubby and Footsie ran their own record label Braindead Entertainment from 2002 to 2007 through which they released their own instrumentals. Footsie revived the label in 2012 to release his first solo vocal EP Zoot Break 2, this was followed by a joint instrumental EP with DJ Tubby entitled The Gray Area and by a 3 volume instrumental album series called King Original. D Double E has appeared as a featured artist on numerous releases as well as having released singles and a solo EP on Dirtee Stank, he also founded his own record label Bluku Music in 2014. Over the years he has featured on a number of prominent releases such as Skepta's "Ladies Hit Squad" from the 2016 album Konnichiwa alongside A$AP Nast.

Footsie's single "Work All Day" produced by Sukh Knight featured on Apple Inc.'s TV commercial for the IPhone 13 launched in September 2021.

D Double E discography
Albums
2018: JackuumSingles
2010: "Street Fighter Riddim" 
2012: "Pumpin' It Out" 
2012: "Be Like Me" (featuring Smurfie Syco)
2014: "Wolly"
2014: "Lovely Jubbly"
2015: "Like This"
2016: "Grim Reaper" (produced by Footsie)
2017: "How I Like It" (produced by Diamondz)
2017: “Shenanigans” (produced by Swifta Beater)

EPs
2011: Bluku Bluku EP2012: Pumpin' It Out EPFootsie discography
Singles
2012: "1 Spliff" 
2012: "B.O.G. (Bag of Grease)" (featuring Darq E Freaker) 
2013: "Spookfest" (featuring JME, D Double E, Jammer, P Money and Chronic)
2014: "Work All Day" (produced by Sukh Knight)
2016: "Hot Water" (featuring Giggs)

EPs
2012: Zoot Break 22015: On This TingInstrumental albums
2013: King Original, Vol 12013: King Original, Vol 22014: King Original, Vol 32017: King Original, Vol 4''

References

External links

Musical groups from the London Borough of Newham
Rappers from London
English hip hop groups
English musical duos
Grime music groups
Year of birth missing (living people)
Living people